Jean Galland (1887–1967) was a French film actor.

Selected filmography
 Fantômas (1932)
 The Oil Sharks (1933)
 The Barber of Seville (1933)
 The Scandal (1934)
 Princesse Tam Tam (1935)
 Whirlpool of Desire (1935)
 Merchant of Love (1935)
 Stradivarius (1935)
 Second Bureau (1935)
 The House of the Spaniard (1936)
The Unknown (1936)
 27 Rue de la Paix (1936)
 The Red Dancer (1937)
 The Novel of Werther (1938)
 Savage Brigade (1939)
 Entente cordiale (1939)
 The Blue Danube (1940)
 The Lost Woman (1942)
 The Man Without a Name (1943)
 La Fugue de Monsieur Perle (1952)
 Earrings of Madame de... (1953)
 Marianne of My Youth (1955)
A Kiss for a Killer (1957)
 The Reluctant Spy (1963)

References

External links
 

1887 births
1967 deaths
People from Laval, Mayenne
French male film actors
20th-century French male actors